Malaysian Rugby, formerly known as Malaysian Rugby Union (Malay: Kesatuan Ragbi Malaysia) is the governing body for rugby union in Malaysia. It was founded in 1921 and  joined the International Rugby Football Board, later known as the International Rugby Board and now as World Rugby, in 1988. They organize the annual Malaysia Sevens tournament.

History
The Malaya Rugby Union (as it was then) was founded in 1921 and joined the IRFB in 1988. The founder members were Selangor, Ipoh District, Singapore, Malacca and Negeri Sembilan.

It is a founding member of the Asian Rugby Football Union.

In 2016, following the re-branding of World Rugby and Asia Rugby, the Malaysia Rugby Union was renamed as Malaysia Rugby.

Council members 2007–2010

 President                            : Dato' Haji Muhammad Muhiyuddin Haji Abdullah
 Deputy President                     : Dato' Seri Hj Abu Raihan bin Wan Jaafar
 Vice President                       : Safaruddin MohammadAhmad Fuad Daud
 Honorary Secretary-General           : M. Suhaimi Zainuddin
 Assistant Honorary Secretary-General : Shaharuddin Khalid
 Honorary Treasurer                   : Abang Najamuddin Jamlus

Council members 2010–2015

 President                            : Dato' Wira Amiruddin Embi
 Deputy President                     : Tan Sri Dato' Wira Abd. Halim bin Hj. Karim
 Vice President                       : Mohd. Zamrin bin Datuk Dr. Yassin
 Honorary Secretary-General           : M. Suhaimi Zainuddin
 Assistant Honorary Secretary-General : Mohd. Herwan bin Sairon
 Honorary Treasurer                   : Abang Najamuddin Jamlus

Council members 2016–present

 President: Dato’ Shahrul Zaman Bin Yahya
 Deputy President: Velayuthan a/l Tan Kim Song
 Vice President: Raimi Yusof, Amir Amri Bin Mohamad
 Committee Members: Lee Nyuk Fah, Mohamad Fahmy Bin Abd Jalil, Professor Madya Dr Ahmad Naim Bin Ismail, Noordin Bin Osman
 General Manager: Mohd Mazuri Sallehudin

Affiliates

  Selangor Rugby Union
  Perlis Rugby Association
  Kedah Rugby Association
  Johor Rugby Union
  Terengganu Rugby Association
  Kelantan Rugby Association
  Negeri Sembilan Rugby Union
  Perak Rugby Union
  Penang Rugby Association
  Pahang Rugby Union
  Sarawak Rugby Union
  Malacca Rugby Union
  Kuala Lumpur Rugby Union
  Sabah Rugby Union
  Royal Malaysian Police Sport Council
  Malaysian Armed Forces Sport Council
  Putrajaya Rugby Association

See also

 Malaysia national rugby union team
 MRU Super League
 MRU Super Cup
 Rugby union in Malaysia

References

External links
 

Rugby union in Malaysia
Rugby union governing bodies in Asia
Rugby union
Sports organizations established in 1921